WWF Over the Edge was a professional wrestling pay-per-view event that was produced by the World Wrestling Federation (WWF, now WWE), a Connecticut-based professional wrestling promotion. The first event was produced as the 22nd In Your House event in May 1998. After the In Your House branding was discontinued following its February 1999 event, Over the Edge branched off as its own PPV in May that year, which was the first of the In Your House events to do so. However, this second event would be the last Over the Edge held due to the death of WWF wrestler Owen Hart at the event. In 2000, the event's pay-per-view slot was replaced by Judgment Day. 

Stone Cold Steve Austin was featured in the main event of both Over the Edge events, defending the WWF Championship at both. Vince McMahon also served as a special guest referee in both of these matches. The first event was also the first WWF pay-per-view event to have a TV Parental Guidelines rating of TV-14.

History
Over the Edge was first held as an In Your House pay-per-view (PPV) event. In Your House was a series of monthly PPVs first produced by the World Wrestling Federation (WWF, now WWE) in May 1995. They aired when the promotion was not holding one of its major PPVs and were sold at a lower cost. Over the Edge: In Your House was the 22nd In Your House event and took place on May 31, 1998, at the Wisconsin Center Arena in Milwaukee, Wisconsin. This first Over the Edge event was also the first WWF pay-per-view event to have a TV Parental Guidelines rating of TV-14.

After the In Your House branding was retired following February 1999's St. Valentine's Day Massacre: In Your House, Over the Edge branched off as its own PPV that May. It was the very first of the In Your House events to branch off as its own PPV. Over the Edge, however, would be a short-lived PPV, as following the death of Owen Hart at the 1999 event, Over the Edge was discontinued and replaced by Judgment Day in 2000.

Events

See also
Owen Hart
History of World Wrestling Entertainment
Stunts that have gone wrong

References

 
Recurring events established in 1998
Recurring events disestablished in 1999